Sigmund Pritchard (15 November 1929 – 18 February 2016) was a Bahamian sailor. He competed in the Flying Dutchman event at the 1960 Summer Olympics.

References

External links
 

1929 births
2016 deaths
Bahamian male sailors (sport)
Olympic sailors of the Bahamas
Sailors at the 1960 Summer Olympics – Flying Dutchman
Sportspeople from Nassau, Bahamas